Romford is a constituency represented in the House of Commons of the UK Parliament since 2001 by Andrew Rosindell, a Conservative. It was created in 1885.

Boundaries 

1885–1918: The Liberty of Havering-atte-Bower, and part of the Sessional Division of Becontree.

1918–1945: The Urban Districts of Barking and Romford, and the Rural District of Romford.

1945–1950: The Borough of Romford.

1950–1955: The Borough of Romford, and the Urban District of Brentwood.

1955–1974: The Borough of Romford.

1974–1983: The London Borough of Havering wards of Bedfords, Central, Collier Row, Gidea Park, Heath Park, Mawney, and Oldchurch.

1983–1997: The London Borough of Havering wards of Brooklands, Chase Cross, Collier Row, Gidea Park, Heath Park, Mawney, Oldchurch, Rise Park, and St Edward's.

1997–2010: The London Borough of Havering wards of Ardleigh Green, Brooklands, Chase Cross, Collier Row, Gidea Park, Heath Park, Mawney, Oldchurch, Rise Park, and St Edward's.

2010–2022: The London Borough of Havering wards of Brooklands, Havering Park, Hylands, Mawneys, Pettits, Romford Town, and Squirrel's Heath.

2022-Present: The London Borough of Havering wards of Havering-Atte-Bower, Hylands & Harrow Lodge, Marshalls & Rise Park, Mawneys, Rush Green & Crowlands, Squirrels Heath, St. Edward's and St. Alban's.

Changes at the 2010 boundary review
Parliament accepted the Boundary Commission's Fifth Periodic Review of Westminster constituencies, which slightly altered this constituency for the 2010 general election: Hylands ward and part of Romford Town ward (following a review of ward boundaries) was transferred into the area from the former constituency of Hornchurch, and the shared part of Emerson Park was transferred from Romford to help form the new Hornchurch and Upminster constituency.

Constituency profile
The constituency covers Romford, Gidea Park and Collier Row in the London Borough of Havering, east London. Although the constituency includes the middle-income Romford Garden Suburb area, ex-council housing forms a substantial part of the constituency, largely bought under the Right to Buy and the borough has a high level of households with vehicle ownership.

History
This seat was created in the Redistribution of Seats Act 1885.

Although Romford has been highly marginal in terms of majorities obtained through much of the 20th century, its boundaries have changed, and it has been Conservative since they gained it in the February 1974 general election when they lost their overall parliamentary majority, with the only Labour victory being a narrow gain in the 1997 landslide. It was one of the few Conservative gains in 2001 with increasingly safe majorities since; the 2015 result made the seat the 157th safest of the Conservative Party's 331 seats by percentage of majority.

Members of Parliament

Elections

Elections in the 2010s

Elections in the 2000s

Elections in the 1990s

Elections in the 1980s

Elections in the 1970s

Elections in the 1960s

Elections in the 1950s

Elections in the 1940s

Elections in the 1930s

Elections in the 1920s

Elections in the 1910s

Elections in the 1900s

Elections in the 1890s

 Caused by Wigram's resignation

 Caused by Theobald's death

Elections in the 1880s

Boundary changes

See also 
 List of parliamentary constituencies in London

Notes

References

Sources

External links 
Politics Resources (Election results from 1922 onwards)
Electoral Calculus (Election results from 1955 onwards)

Politics of the London Borough of Havering
Parliamentary constituencies in London
Constituencies of the Parliament of the United Kingdom established in 1885
Romford